is a railway station in Suma-ku, Kobe, Hyōgo Prefecture, Japan.

Around 20,000 passenger ride the subway from this station, the second most on the Seishin-Yamate Line after Sannomiya Station. Myodani station is the most used station in Suma-ku.

Lines
Kobe Municipal Subway
Seishin-Yamate Line Station S12

Layout

Railway stations in Hyōgo Prefecture
Stations of Kobe Municipal Subway
Railway stations in Japan opened in 1977